Suzan Lamens and Quirine Lemoine were the defending champions but chose not to participate.

Aliona Bolsova and Guiomar Maristany won the title, defeating Michaela Bayerlová and Aneta Laboutková in the final, 6–2, 6–2.

Seeds

Draw

Draw

References

External Links
Main Draw

Amstelveen Women's Open - Doubles